The Benetton B188 is a Formula One racing car designed by Rory Byrne and raced by Benetton team in the 1988 Formula One season and in the first half of the 1989 Formula One season.

1988

Background and design 
Benetton was effectively the Ford works team as they had exclusive use of the 3.5L Ford DFR V8 engine for 1988 where others running Ford-Cosworth power had to make do with 's DFZ engine. When the FIA announced that turbos would be banned after 1988, Ford made the decision to halt development of the V6 Ford TEC turbocharged engine used in the B188's predecessor the B187, and instead concentrated on the development of an engine for the new 3.5L rules. As Benetton were under contract to run the Ford engine (a contract they did not wish to break), the teams designers were forced to design a car to take the naturally aspirated V8 rather than the turbocharged V6. Despite this, the B188 was visually similar to the B187 it replaced, though it featured a bulkier engine cover to house both the larger engine and a larger fuel tank, as well as featuring larger twin air intakes (located above each sidepod, rather than above the drivers head as would become the norm). The B188 also featured a longer, sleeker looking nose section to take advantage of the rule that would come in from  that meant the drivers feet had to be behind the front axle line.

However, where as the turbo powered cars were restricted to a fuel tank size of 150 litres, the atmospheric cars fuel tank size was able to be much larger. The B188 reportedly had the largest fuel tank on the grid at 215 litres.

Competition history 
The B188 was driven by the teams  driver, Belgian Thierry Boutsen, and the hard charging, chain smoking Italian Alessandro Nannini, who had joined Benetton for his 3rd F1 season after two years driving the uncompetitive Minardis with their overweight and underpowered Motori Moderni turbo engines. The B188 was a consistent performer and was usually the class of the atmospheric cars, a class which also included the F1 Constructors' Champions of the previous two years Williams, and the up-and-coming March team (whose car was designed by a young Adrian Newey), both of whom were using the new  Judd CV V8 engine.

Boutsen would score 27 points, including 5 podium finishes, to claim 4th in the Drivers' Championship with five 3rd-place finishes, while Nannini scored 12 points, including his first ever podium with 3rd at the British Grand Prix (despite two spins on the very wet Silverstone Circuit) and a second 3rd place later in the season in Spain. Overall with the B188, Benetton finished 3rd in the Constructors' Championship with 39 points, 16 points in front of 4th placed Lotus, who not only used the same Honda engines as the dominant McLarens, but also had reigning World Champion Nelson Piquet as lead driver. Benetton would have in fact finished the season with 46 points but both cars were disqualified from the Belgian Grand Prix for using irregular fuel. The disqualification of the Benettons was not made official until a month after the season had finished, so many published records list Boutsen and Nannini as having finished third and fourth respectively at Spa.

1989

Background and design 
For  Boutsen left to join Williams and was replaced by British rookie Johnny Herbert while the highly rated Nannini assumed the role of lead driver. The B188 was to be replaced by the B189 early in the season which would also see the team with exclusive use of the new development Ford HB4 V8 engine. Unfortunately due to delays with the new engine and a testing crash by Nannini before the San Marino Grand Prix, the team was forced to use the B188 with the old DFR engine as the new motor was designed around the new car and didn't fit in the 1988 model (the DFR was a 90° V8 while the new HB was a 75° V8. Using the DFR in the B189 would have required a complete re-design of the rear suspension and engine cover).

Competition history 
Despite the B188 being seen by the team as obsolete being a previous years model and with other teams now running customer DFR's, Nannini and Herbert scored 13 points in the first six races of the season with the best being Nannini's 3rd at San Marino. Herbert, who was also recovering from a horrific Formula 3000 crash at Brands Hatch in 1988, scored points on debut in Brazil, finishing 4th (only 1.123 seconds behind 3rd placed Maurício Gugelmin's March-Judd and only 10.493 behind the Ferrari of race winner Nigel Mansell), and two places and 8 seconds ahead of Nannini. Despite a 5th-place finish in the desert heat in Phoenix where the race ran its full two hours, it became obvious in the opening rounds that he needed more time to recover from injuries that included both legs being badly broken (he was actually still in laid up hospital when the team announced him as their new 1989 driver at the 1988 Spanish Grand Prix). Herbert was replaced after the Canadian Grand Prix by McLaren test driver Emanuele Pirro. Pirro was chosen as even though he was an F1 rookie, he had experience driving F1 cars with McLaren, and as an Italian he satisfied the team owners want for an Italian driver. Despite driving for Benetton for from the French Grand Prix until the end of the season, Pirro was mostly based in Japan where he continued working with Honda as McLaren's test driver at the Suzuka Circuit.

Nannini debuted the B189 at the 1989 French Grand Prix while the last race for the B188 was by Pirro at the British Grand Prix. He qualified 26th and last and finished 11th.

The Ford V8 powered Benetton B188 competed in 24 races, scoring 52 points and 8 podium finishes. Nannini also scored the car's only fastest lap at the 1988 German Grand Prix at a wet Hockenheimring.

Complete Formula One results
(key) (Results in italics indicate fastest lap)

* 26 points scored in  using Benetton B189

References

External links

B188
1988 Formula One season cars
1989 Formula One season cars